Oxya chinensis is a species of short-horned grasshopper in the family Acrididae. It is found in south and eastern Asia, and Oceania.

References

External links

 

chinensis
Insect pests of millets